A strength athlete is a person who trains for or competes in events in which muscular strength and power play a primary role. Such events include weightlifting and powerlifting, strength athletics and strongman competitions, and arm wrestling, as well as the "heavy throws" of track and field: shot put, discus, and hammer. The players at certain positions in other sports are also considered strength athletes, including linemen in American football and forwards in rugby football.

The term is also sometimes used to refer to any athlete who participates in regular strength training or weight training, as well as bodybuilders.

Strength athletics